Sigrid Kirchmann (born March 29, 1966 in Bad Ischl) is a former high jumper from Austria, best known for winning Austria's first ever medal at the World Championships in Athletics. She did so in 1993, finishing third behind two Cubans. Also competing in the pentathlon, Kirchmann represented her native country in the women's high jump at the 1992 Summer Olympics.

International competitions

References
Profile

1966 births
Living people
Austrian female high jumpers
Athletes (track and field) at the 1992 Summer Olympics
Olympic athletes of Austria
World Athletics Championships medalists
People from Bad Ischl
Sportspeople from Upper Austria